Cardiogenic shock (CS) is a medical emergency resulting from inadequate blood flow due to the dysfunction of the ventricles of the heart. Signs of inadequate blood flow include low urine production (<30 mL/hour), cool arms and legs, and altered level of consciousness. People may also have a severely low blood pressure and heart rate.

Causes of cardiogenic shock include cardiomyopathic, arrhythmic, and mechanical. CS is most commonly precipitated by acute myocardial infarction. People can have combined types of shock.

Treatment of cardiogenic shock depends on the cause with the initial goals to improve blood flow to the body. This can be  done in a number of ways—fluid resuscitation, blood transfusions, vasopressors, and ionotropes. If cardiogenic shock is due to a heart attack, attempts to open the heart's arteries may help. An intra-aortic balloon pump may improve matters until this can be done. Medications that improve the heart's ability to contract (positive inotropes) may help; however, it is unclear which is best and at present there is no convincing evidence supporting inotropic or vasodilating therapy to reduce mortality in hemodynamically unstable patients.   Norepinephrine may be better if the blood pressure is very low whereas dopamine or dobutamine may be more useful if only slightly low. Cardiogenic shock is a condition that is difficult to fully reverse even with an early diagnosis. With that being said, early initiation of mechanical circulatory support, early percutaneous coronary intervention, inotropes, and heart transplantation may improve outcomes. Care is directed to the dysfunctional organs (dialysis for the kidneys, mechanical ventilation for lungs dysfunction).

Mortality rates have been decreasing in the United States. This is likely due to the rapid identification and treatment of the CS. Some studies have suggested that this possibly related to the increased use of coronary reperfusion strategies, like heart stents. Nonetheless, the mortality rates remain high. Multi-organ failure is associated with higher rates of mortality.

Signs and symptoms
The presentation is the following:
 Anxiety, restlessness, altered mental state due to decreased blood flow to the brain and subsequent hypoxia.
 Low blood pressure due to decrease in cardiac output.
 A rapid, weak, thready pulse due to decreased circulation combined with tachycardia.
 Cool, clammy, and mottled skin (cutis marmorata) due to vasoconstriction and subsequent hypoperfusion of the skin.
 Distended jugular veins due to increased jugular venous pressure.
 Oliguria (low urine output) due to inadequate blood flow to the kidneys if the condition persists.
 Rapid and deeper respirations (hyperventilation) due to sympathetic nervous system stimulation and acidosis.
 Fatigue due to hyperventilation and hypoxia.
 Absent pulse in fast and abnormal heart rhythms.
 Pulmonary edema, involving fluid back-up in the lungs due to insufficient pumping of the heart.

Causes 
Cardiogenic shock is caused by the failure of the heart to pump effectively.  It is due to damage to the heart muscle, most often from a heart attack or myocardial contusion. Other causes include abnormal heart rhythms, cardiomyopathy, heart valve problems, ventricular outflow obstruction (i.e. systolic anterior motion (SAM) in hypertrophic cardiomyopathy), or ventriculoseptal defects. It can also be caused by a sudden decompressurization (e.g. in an aircraft), where air bubbles are released into the bloodstream (Henry's law), causing heart failure.

Diagnosis

Electrocardiogram 
An electrocardiogram helps to establish the exact diagnosis and guides treatment, it may reveal:
 Abnormal heart rhythms, such as bradycardia (slowed heart rate)
 myocardial infarction (ST-elevation MI, STEMI, is usually more dangerous than non-STEMIs; MIs that affect the ventricles are usually more dangerous than those that affect the atria; those affecting the left side of the heart, especially the left ventricle, are usually more dangerous than those affecting the right side, unless that side is severely compromised)
 Signs of cardiomyopathy

Echocardiography
Echocardiography may show poor ventricular function, signs of PED, rupture of the interventricular septum, an obstructed outflow tract or cardiomyopathy.

Swan-Ganz catheter
The Swan–Ganz catheter or pulmonary artery catheter may assist in the diagnosis by providing information on the hemodynamics.

Biopsy
When cardiomyopathy is suspected as the cause of cardiogenic shock, a biopsy of heart muscle may be needed to make a definite diagnosis.

Cardiac index

If the cardiac index falls acutely below 2.2 L/min/m2, the person may be in cardiogenic shock.

Treatment
Depending on the type of cardiogenic shock, treatment involves infusion of fluids, or in shock refractory to fluids, inotropic medications. In case of an abnormal heart rhythm immediate synchronized cardioversion or anti-arrhythmic agents may be administered, e.g. adenosine.

Positive inotropic agents (such as dobutamine or milrinone), which enhance the heart's pumping capabilities, are used to improve the contractility and correct the low blood pressure.  Should that not suffice an intra-aortic balloon pump (which reduces workload for the heart, and improves perfusion of the coronary arteries) or a left ventricular assist device (which augments the pump-function of the heart) can be considered. Mechanical ventilation or ECMO may be used to help stabilize people with severe or refractory cardiogenic shock until they can be given some type of definitive treatment, such as a ventricular assist device. Finally, as a last resort, if the person is stable enough and otherwise qualifies, heart transplantation, or if not eligible an artificial heart, can be placed. These invasive measures are important tools—more than 50% of patients who do not die immediately due to cardiac arrest from a lethal abnormal heart rhythm and live to reach the hospital (who have usually experienced a severe acute myocardial infarction, which in itself still has a relatively high mortality rate), die within the first 24 hours. The mortality rate for those still living at time of admission who develop complications (among others, cardiac arrest or further abnormal heart rhythms, heart failure, cardiac tamponade, a ruptured or dissecting aneurysm, or another heart attack) from cardiogenic shock is even worse around 85%, especially without drastic measures such as ventricular assist devices or transplantation.

Cardiogenic shock may be treated with intravenous dobutamine, which acts on β1 receptors of the heart leading to increased contractility and heart rate.

References

External links 

 Cardiogenic Shock by eMedicine

Heart diseases
Medical emergencies
Intensive care medicine

ja:心停止